The Bulletin of the World Health Organization is a monthly public health journal published by the World Health Organization that was established in 1947. Articles are published in English and abstracts are available in Arabic, Chinese, English, French, Russian, and Spanish.

It is open access journal and uses the Creative Commons 3.0 IGO license (specifically CC BY 3.0 IGO).

History 
In 1999, under the Director-Generalship of Gro Harlem Brundtland (1998–2003), the Bulletin of the World Health Organization was given its current title, and subsumed two other WHO periodicals: the World Health Forum, which published accounts of field work and was oriented towards primary health care, and the World Health Statistics Quarterly (journal abbreviation Wld hlth statist. quart.; French: Rapport trimestriel de statistiques sanitaires mondiales, journal abbreviation Rapp. trimest. statist. sanit. mond.), which mainly published epidemiological data; the latter was previously known in English as the World Health Statistics Report.

Abstracting and indexing 
The Bulletin is abstracted and indexed in Abstracts on Hygiene, Biological Abstracts, Current Contents, Excerpta Medica, International Pharmaceutical Abstracts, Index Medicus/MEDLINE/PubMed, Nutrition Abstracts and Reviews, Pollution Abstracts, Science Citation Index, and Tropical Diseases Bulletin. According to the Journal Citation Reports, the journal has a 2020 impact factor of 9.408, ranking it 7th out of 193 journals in the category "Public, Environmental & Occupational Health".

See also
Other publications of the World Health Organization:
Eastern Mediterranean Health Journal
Human Resources for Health (journal published in collaboration with BioMed Central)
Pan American Journal of Public Health
World Health Report
WHO South-East Asia Journal of Public Health

References

External links
 

World Health Organization academic journals
Publications established in 1947
Public health journals
Open access journals
Monthly journals
Multilingual journals